Lee Yoo-yeon (born September 4, 2000) is a South Korean swimmer specialized in freestyle.

Career
In October 2018, he represented South Korea at the 2018 Summer Youth Olympics held in Buenos Aires, Argentina. He competed in 50m freestyle, 100m freestyle, 200m freestyle and mixed 4 × 100m freestyle relay events. In the 50m freestyle heats event, he completed at rank 9, allowing him to advance to compete in the semifinal. In the 50m freestyle semifinal event, he completed at rank 8 with Robin Hanson. In semifinal swim-off against Robin, he completed at rank 2 hence did not advance to compete in the final. In the 100m freestyle heats event, he completed at rank 1, allowing him to advance to compete in the semifinal. In the 100m freestyle semifinal event, he completed at rank 3, allowing him to compete in the final which he completed at rank 5. In the 200m freestyle heats event, he completed at rank 7, allowing him to compete in the final which he completed at rank 8. In the freestyle relay event, the team did not advance to compete in the final.

In July 2019, he represented South Korea at the 2019 Summer Universiade held in Naples, Italy. In the same month, he represented South Korea at the 2019 World Aquatics Championships. He competed in 4 × 200m freestyle relay, the team did not advance to compete in the final and qualify for the 2020 Summer Olympics which are awarded to top 12 teams in the standings.

In July 2021, he represented South Korea at the 2020 Summer Olympics held in Tokyo, Japan. He competed in 4 × 200m freestyle relay event. The team did not advance to compete in the final.

References

External links
 
 

2000 births
Living people
South Korean male freestyle swimmers
Swimmers at the 2020 Summer Olympics
Olympic swimmers of South Korea
People from Anyang, Gyeonggi
Swimmers at the 2018 Summer Youth Olympics
Sportspeople from Gyeonggi Province
21st-century South Korean people